Evyatar is an Israeli outpost in the West Bank located in a Palestinian rural area on Mount Sabih, in lands of the Palestinian town of Beita, south of Nablus. Israeli outposts in the West Bank, like Evyatar, are considered illegal both under international law as well as under Israeli law.

It was built rapidly in a few days in May 2021, before the Israeli military stopped the activities. Israeli soldiers helped to build the outpost, although they were not authorized to do so. As of May 2022, the buildings are still standing but the settlers have not been allowed to return. It has been described as "the most famous outpost established in recent years".

The building of the outpost, and the subsequent legal process intended to make it permanent, sparked regular Palestinian protests; as of May 2022, 8 Palestinians have been killed by Israeli soldiers during the protests.

According to Nathaniel Berman, Evyatar is "emblematic of the process whereby settlers are able to seize land with the express purpose of disrupting Palestinian life and are able to secure state ratification of their actions. This is a regime which lends fodder to some of the worst charges laid against Israel in recent years, including apartheid."

History 
The Israeli outpost at Evyatar was established in 2013 as a reaction to the 2013 Tapuah Junction stabbing in which Evyatar Borovsky was killed. The outpost has been destroyed several times by Israeli officials. It was re-established in May 2021. Residents of the outpost, illegal under Israeli law, were to be evicted on 4 July 2021.

On 27 February 2023, the day after a rampage by Israeli Settlers in the Palestinian village of Huwara, Minister of National Security Itamar Ben-Gvir organized a gathering in the outpost as it was being evicted, saying that people should not take the law into their own hands while also vowing to crush the enemy, during the gathering he also announced that he was discussing the matter of legalizing the outpost with Prime Minister Benjamin Netanyahu

Arrangement to vacate 
After a compromise with the Israeli authorities stipulating that the outpost's structures are to remain intact and the settlers may return if the land is subsequently deemed state-owned, the residents vacated the settlement on July 2. On July 8, 2021, Palestinians from nearby villages petitioned Israel's High Court of Justice to revoke this compromise on the grounds that they hold the rights to the land. On July 9, 2021, Israeli forces fired on hundreds of Palestinian demonstrators protesting land confiscation at nearby Beita. The Palestine Red Crescent said 379 protesters were wounded, 31 by live ammunition. On August 14, 2021, Palestinian rioters demonstrated putting up a swastika inside a burning star of David. The building of the outpost, and the subsequent legal process intended to make it permanent, sparked regular Palestinian protests; as of May 2022, 8 Palestinians have been killed by Israeli soldiers during the protests.  In October 2021, 60 dunams (15 acres) was appropriated as state land, and in February 2022 then-attorney general Avichai Mandelblit approved forming a legal settlement there, encouraging the position of settler leader Yossi Dagan, head of the Samaria Regional Council for populating Evyatar and other outposts. The supporters of populating the outpost expect the new government will promote this position.

References 

Israeli settlements in the West Bank
Israeli outposts
Unauthorized Israeli settlements